This was the third season of rugby league's League Cup competition, which for sponsorship reasons was known as the Players No.6 Trophy.

Warrington won the final, beating Rochdale Hornets by the score of 27-16 in the match played at Central Park, Wigan. The attendance was 9,347 and receipts were £4380.

Background 
This season saw no changes in the  entrants, no new members and no withdrawals, the number remaining at thirty-two.

Competition and results

Round 1 - First  Round 

Involved  16 matches and 32 Clubs

Round 2 - Second  Round 

Involved  8 matches and 16 Clubs
NOTE - Matches in this round kicked off earlier to make maximum use of the daylight
Use of Floodlights in sporting events was banned by government order from 15 November 1973 due to mining strikes

Round 3 -Quarter Finals 

Involved 4 matches with 8 clubs

Round 3 -Quarter Finals - Replays 
Involved 1 match with 2 clubs

Round 4 – Semi-Finals 

Involved 2 matches and 4 Clubs

Final

Teams and Scorers John Player yearbook 1974–75 

Scoring - Try = three points - Goal = two points - Drop goal = one point

Timeline in the  final

Prize money 
As part of the sponsorship deal and funds, the  prize money awarded to the competing teams for this season is as follows :-

Note - the  author is unable to trace the  rest of the  award amounts. Can anyone help ?

The road to success 
This tree excludes any preliminary round fixtures

Notes and comments 
1 * RUGBYLEAGUEproject states that the match was played at Bradford, whereas it was played at Lawkholme Lane, Keighley
2 * St Helens official archives give the  attendance as 2,500  whereas RUGBYLEAGUEproject gives it as 3,000
3 * Dewsbury Celtic are a Junior (amateur) club from Dewsbury, home ground is Crow Nest Park
4 * The John Player Yearbook 1974–75 and the News of the World Football Annual 1974–75  give the attendance as 1,250  but RUGBYLEAGUEproject give it as 1,276
5 * Millom are a Junior (amateur) club from Cumbria,  current home ground is the Coronation Field ground
6 * The  highest score, to date in the  competition against a Junior club
7 * Widnes official archives give the  result as a Wiidnes win
8 * Wigan official archives show a score of 30-3 but RUGBYLEAGUEproject give it as 20-5
9 * Matches kicked off Earlier to accommodate daylight. Use of Floodlights was banned by government order from 15 November 1973 due to mining strikes.
10 * Wigan official archives give score as 28-3 but RUGBYLEAGUEproject give it as 28-2
11 * Wigan's hooker (Colin Clarke) and two Keighley players (Wilmot and Burke) were sent off during this second half of this match.  
12 * The John Player Yearbook 1974–75 give the date as 9-12-1974  but RUGBYLEAGUEproject give the date as 29-12-1974
13 * The John Player Yearbook 1974–75 give the date as 9-12-1974  but RUGBYLEAGUEproject give the  date as 30-12-1974
14 * The John Player Yearbook 1974–75, the News of the World Football Annual 1974–75 and Wigan official archives give the date as Saturday 5-1-1974  but RUGBYLEAGUEproject give the  date as Sunday 6-1-1974
15 *  The John Player Yearbook 1974–75 gives the  attendance as 10,047 but RUGBYLEAGUEproject give the  attendance as 9,347
16  * Central Park was the home ground of Wigan with a final capacity of 18,000, although the record attendance was  47,747 for Wigan v St Helens 27 March 1959

General information for those unfamiliar 
The council of the Rugby Football League voted to introduce a new competition, to be similar to The Football Association and Scottish Football Association's "League Cup". It was to be a similar knock-out structure to, and to be secondary to, the Challenge Cup. As this was being formulated, sports sponsorship was becoming more prevalent and as a result John Player and Sons, a division of Imperial Tobacco Company, became sponsors, and the competition never became widely known as the "League Cup" 
The competition ran from 1971–72 until 1995-96 and was initially intended for the professional clubs plus the two amateur BARLA National Cup finalists. In later seasons the entries were expanded to take in other amateur and French teams. The competition was dropped due to "fixture congestion" when Rugby League became a summer sport
The Rugby League season always (until the onset of "Summer Rugby" in 1996) ran from around August-time through to around May-time and this competition always took place early in the season, in the Autumn, with the final usually taking place in late January 
The competition was variably known, by its sponsorship name, as the Player's No.6 Trophy (1971–1977), the John Player Trophy (1977–1983), the John Player Special Trophy (1983–1989), and the Regal Trophy in 1989.

See also 
1973–74 Northern Rugby Football League season
1973 Lancashire Cup
1973 Yorkshire Cup
Player's No.6 Trophy
Rugby league county cups

References

External links
Saints Heritage Society
1896–97 Northern Rugby Football Union season at wigan.rlfans.com 
Hull&Proud Fixtures & Results 1896/1897
Widnes Vikings - One team, one passion Season In Review - 1896-97
The Northern Union at warringtonwolves.org
Huddersfield R L Heritage
Wakefield until I die

1973 in English rugby league
1974 in English rugby league
League Cup (rugby league)